Guy de Blanchefort (1446–1513) was the 42nd Grand Master of the Knights Hospitaller from 1512 to 1513.

When Grandmaster Emery d'Amboise died in 1512, Guy de Blanchefort was elected the new Grand Master. Guy was in Nice, and he sailed to Rhodes when he heard the news. He died during the journey and never made it to Rhodes. When news of his death reached Rhodes, Fabrizio del Carretto was elected the new Grand Master.

Grand Masters of the Knights Hospitaller
16th-century French people
1446 births
1513 deaths